The Way Love Goes may refer to:

 "The Way Love Goes" (Lemar song), 2010
 "The Way Love Goes" (Brian McKnight song), 1992
 "The Way Love Goes" (Jamie Warren song), 1998